Egbert Rubertus Derk Schaap (4 July 1862 – 24 May 1939) was a Dutch draughtsman and painter. His work was part of the art competitions at the 1924 Summer Olympics and the 1936 Summer Olympics. He married a fellow artist, Hendrika van der Pek.

The Rijksmuseum in Amsterdam has a few of his paintings and almost fifty of his drawings in their collection.

Gallery

References

1862 births
1939 deaths
19th-century Dutch painters
20th-century Dutch painters
Dutch male painters
Olympic competitors in art competitions
People from Utrecht (province)
19th-century Dutch male artists
20th-century Dutch male artists